The meridian 113° east of Greenwich is a line of longitude that extends from the North Pole across the Arctic Ocean, Asia, the Indian Ocean, Australasia, the Southern Ocean, and Antarctica to the South Pole.

The 113th meridian east forms a great circle with the 67th meridian west.

From Pole to Pole
Starting at the North Pole and heading south to the South Pole, the 113th meridian east passes through:

{| class="wikitable plainrowheaders"
! scope="col" width="130" | Co-ordinates
! scope="col" | Country, territory or sea
! scope="col" | Notes
|-
| style="background:#b0e0e6;" | 
! scope="row" style="background:#b0e0e6;" | Arctic Ocean
| style="background:#b0e0e6;" |
|-
| style="background:#b0e0e6;" | 
! scope="row" style="background:#b0e0e6;" | Laptev Sea
| style="background:#b0e0e6;" |
|-
| 
! scope="row" | 
| Krasnoyarsk Krai — Taymyr Peninsula
|-
| style="background:#b0e0e6;" | 
! scope="row" style="background:#b0e0e6;" | Laptev Sea
| style="background:#b0e0e6;" |
|-
| 
! scope="row" | 
| Sakha Republic — Bolshoy Begichev Island
|-
| style="background:#b0e0e6;" | 
! scope="row" style="background:#b0e0e6;" | Laptev Sea
| style="background:#b0e0e6;" |
|-valign="top"
| 
! scope="row" | 
| Sakha Republic Irkutsk Oblast — from  Republic of Buryatia — from  Zabaykalsky Krai — from 
|-
| 
! scope="row" | 
|
|-valign="top"
| 
! scope="row" | 
|-valign="top"
| style="background:#b0e0e6;" | 
! scope="row" style="background:#b0e0e6;" | South China Sea
| style="background:#b0e0e6;" | Passing through the disputed Paracel Islands Passing through the disputed Spratly Islands
|-
| 
! scope="row" | 
| Sarawak – on the island of Borneo
|-
| 
! scope="row" | 
| West Kalimantan – on the island of Borneo – for about 13 km
|-
| 
! scope="row" | 
| Sarawak – on the island of Borneo, for about 5 km
|-
| 
! scope="row" | 
| Island of BorneoWest KalimantanCentral Kalimantan
|-
| style="background:#b0e0e6;" | 
! scope="row" style="background:#b0e0e6;" | Java Sea
| style="background:#b0e0e6;" |
|-
| 
! scope="row" | 
| Island of Madura
|-
| style="background:#b0e0e6;" | 
! scope="row" style="background:#b0e0e6;" | Madura Strait
| style="background:#b0e0e6;" |
|-
| 
! scope="row" | 
| Island of Java
|-valign="top"
| style="background:#b0e0e6;" | 
! scope="row" style="background:#b0e0e6;" | Indian Ocean
| style="background:#b0e0e6;" | Passing just west of Bernier Island (at ) and Dorre Island (at ), Western Australia, 
|-
| 
! scope="row" | 
| Western Australia – Dirk Hartog Island
|-
| style="background:#b0e0e6;" | 
! scope="row" style="background:#b0e0e6;" | Indian Ocean
| style="background:#b0e0e6;" |
|-
| style="background:#b0e0e6;" | 
! scope="row" style="background:#b0e0e6;" | Southern Ocean
| style="background:#b0e0e6;" |
|-
| 
! scope="row" | Antarctica
| Australian Antarctic Territory, claimed by 
|-
|}

e113 meridian east